Taughannock Creek is a river located in Tompkins and Schuyler counties in New York. It flows into Cayuga Lake east of Trumansburg. Taughannock Falls is located on the creek.

Course
It is the tallest single-drop waterfall east of the Rocky Mountains.

References

Rivers of Tompkins County, New York
Rivers of New York (state)
Rivers of Schuyler County, New York